Panic Fancy (stylized in all caps) is Japanese alternative rock (a.k.a. mixture rock) band Orange Range's ninth major album. Upon its launch on July 9, 2008, Panic Fancy topped the Japanese Oricon Album Charts at #1 position.

The album features both opening and ending themes to the Sunrise anime Code Geass: Lelouch of the Rebellion R2, "O2" and "Shiawase Neiro", respectively, and also includes a special commercial for Code Geass: Lelouch of the Rebellion R2 featuring Orange Range in the special-edition DVD version.

Track listing

References

2008 albums
Orange Range albums
Gr8! Records albums